The Botswana Accountancy College, or BAC, is a business school headquartered in the city of Gaborone, Botswana. Initially funded and established through a joint venture between Ministry of Finance and Development Planning and Debswana, the college caters for the accountancy and information technology tertiary needs of the country. The Botswana Accountancy College asserts itself as the center of excellence in Southern Africa and beyond. It specializes in areas of accounting, finance, business, management, hospitality, taxation, leisure and ICT. BAC has two  campuses; the main campus is in Gaborone and the other in Francistown.The Gaborone Campus is located in the Fairgrounds Office Park of south-east Gaborone.

The college has collaborations with The University of Derby, the University of Sunderland and Sheffield Hallam University in England.

History
The college was established in 1996 as a joint venture between the Ministry of Finance and Development Planning (MFDP), The Debswana Diamond Company and the Botswana Institute of Accountants, enrolling 349 ACCA, CIMA, AAT and NCC diploma students. Botswana Accountancy College also offers undergraduate programs that are accredited by the University of Derby. The objectives of the college  were to  reduce  the reliance on expatriate  accountants  and in the long term  to  be a self-funding  project. BAC  is a company limited by  guarantee  with three sponsors as the shareholders.  The MFDP and Debswana funded BAC until 2007. The Gaborone Campus is located in the Fairgrounds Office Park of south-east Gaborone.

Facilities
Within Gaborone, BAC operates from three closely linked campuses: 
 Main Campus,
 BIFM (Fairgrounds Office Park Block D building) 2nd Floor across the road from the main campus, 
 Fairgrounds Financial Centre, located within the Fairgrounds location

Cafeteria

Accommodation
BAC can accommodate 112 residential students at the main campus in Gaborone. There are three residential blocks to accommodate  students, named after Botswana's revolutionary leaders; Khama, Bathoen I, and Sechele.

Student life
BAC offers extra-curricular societies and clubs to students:
 The Business Hive was founded in August 2011. It is an entrepreneurship and finance fraternity to allow students to sample the corporate world during their tenure at BAC through workshops, training and competitions with Botswana entrepreneurs, mentors and finance professionals.
 The Debate Society was founded in January 2011. The students have represented BAC across southern Africa in debating tournaments, as well as Berlin, Germany for the World Universities Debating Championship.
 BAC Rugby team

Stakeholders
Stakeholders in BAC include::
Ministry of Finance,
Ministry of Education,
Debswana,
Botswana Institute of Chartered Accountants,
Tertiary Education Council.

Partners
The University of Derby,
The University of Sunderland,
The Botswana Unified Revenue Service,
The Insurance Institute of South Africa.
 Sheffield Hallam University

References

External links
 Botswana Accountancy College  Website
 Botswana Accountancy College at the University of Derby

Universities in Gaborone
Business schools in Africa
Educational institutions established in 1996
1996 establishments in Botswana